Barry Gjerde is a Norwegian-born Canadian-Japanese voice actor who has worked for many years in Japan as voice actor, and as a translator; mostly narrating various corporate projects and providing English voice acting for video games.

Career 
He is best known for his voicing of the character Barry Burton in the original version of Resident Evil. He also provided the voice of Rick in the game Clock Tower. In Mega Man X7 he provided the voice of Red, a rival Maverick hunter.

He also played guitar and did vocals for a band called "Hotel No-Tell" with Ian MacDougall (vocals, guitar), Tom Gottsman (bass guitar, vocals), Jon MacKenzie (vocals, bass guitar), and John Boudreau (drums). They released an extended play in 1989.

Filmography

Television

Video games

Discography

Music

Hotel No-Tell 

 俺は外人 [Ore Wa Gaijin] (EP, 1989; B&I Records); Vocals, Guitar (all tracks)
 Ore Wa Gaijin (2:22)
 Nice People (2:17)
 Mind Your Own Business (2:59)

References

External links
 
 
 

Living people
Norwegian male video game actors
Norwegian male voice actors
People from Vestnes
People from Møre og Romsdal
Norwegian expatriates in Japan
20th-century Norwegian male actors
21st-century Norwegian male actors
Year of birth missing (living people)